Cryptostephanus is a genus of African plants in the family Amaryllidaceae, native to Kenya, Tanzania, Angola, Mozambique, Zimbabwe and Namibia. Its closest relative is Clivia, with which it shares some characters, including thick, fleshy roots, strap-like leaves, and fruit in the form of a berry.

Species
 Cryptostephanus densiflorus Welw. ex Baker - Angola, Namibia
 Cryptostephanus haemanthoides  Pax - Kenya, Tanzania
 Cryptostephanus vansonii Verd. - Mozambique, Zimbabwe

References

External links 
Cryptostephanus - Pacific Bulb Society

Amaryllidoideae
Flora of Africa
Taxa named by Friedrich Welwitsch
Taxa named by John Gilbert Baker
Amaryllidaceae genera